This article details the Catalans Dragons rugby league football club's 2008 season. This is their 3rd season in the Super League.

Table

Milestones

Round 1: Dane Carlaw and Jean-Philippe Baile made their debuts for the Dragons.
Round 2: Aaron Gorrell scored his 1st try for the Dragons.
Round 5: Justin Murphy made his 50th appearance for the Dragons.
Round 7: Dane Carlaw scored his 1st try for the Dragons.
Round 9: Thomas Bosc kicked his 100th goal for the Dragons.
Round 10: Thomas Bosc reached 300 points for the Dragons.
CCR4: Olivier Elima and Florian Quintilla made their debuts for the Dragons.
Round 14: Thomas Bosc made his 50th appearance for the Dragons.
Round 17: Clint Greenshields scored his 1st hat-trick for the Dragons.
Round 17: Clint Greenshields scored his 25th try and reached 100 points for the Dragons.
Round 17: Olivier Elima scored his 1st try for the Dragons.
Round 18: Clint Greenshields made his 50th appearance for the Dragons.
Round 18: Thomas Bosc reached 400 points for the Dragons.
Round 20: Adam Mogg made his 50th appearance for the Dragons.
Round 25: Jamal Fakir made his 50th appearance for the Dragons.
Round 26: Jean-Philippe Baile scored his 1st try for the Dragons.
Round 26: Thomas Bosc scored his 25th try for the Dragons.
EPO: Justin Murphy scored his 1st four-try haul and his 3rd hat-trick for the Dragons.
EPO: Justin Murphy scored his 50th try and reached 200 points for the Dragons.
ESF: John Wilson scored his 25th try and reached 100 points for the Dragons.

Fixtures and results

2008 Super League

Super League Play-offs

Player appearances
Super League only

 = Injured

 = Suspended

Challenge Cup

Player appearances
Challenge Cup games only

Squad statistics

 Appearances and Points include (Super League, Challenge Cup and play-offs) as of 20 September 2008.

Transfers

In

Out

References

2008 in rugby league by club
2008 in English rugby league
Catalans Dragons seasons